Suavegotha (died after 549), also known as Suavegotta or Suavegotho, was probably the wife of the Frankish king Theuderic I. 

Suavegotha was the daughter of the Burgundian king Sigismund and his Ostrogothic wife Ostrogotho. According to the historian Gregory of Tours, Theuderic married a daughter of the Burgundian king Sigismund. He does however not mention the name of this wife. The wife of Theuderic is often identified with the queen Suavegotha mentioned by the 10th century chronicler Flodoard. According to Flodoard, Suavegotha had a daughter named Theudechild. According to the German historian Eugen Ewig, Suavegotha was the wife of Theuderich, and the daughter of Sigismund's second wife, whose name is unknown.

Sources
 Martina Hartmann: Die Königin im frühen Mittelalter. Kohlhammer Verlag, Stuttgart 2009, S. 66.
 Matthias Springer: Theuderich I. In: Reallexikon der Germanischen Altertumskunde (RGA). 2. Auflage. Band 30, Walter de Gruyter, Berlin / New York 2005, S. 459–463 (hier: 461).

480s births
5th-century Germanic people
6th-century Germanic people
Amali dynasty
Burgundian queens consort
Ostrogothic women
Year of death unknown
6th-century Frankish women